Howard Lloyd Kennedy (born April 13, 1928) was an American politician in the state of South Dakota. He was a member of the South Dakota House of Representatives from 1981 to 1992. He was a farmer and livestock feeder.

References

Living people
1928 births
People from Beresford, South Dakota
Republican Party members of the South Dakota House of Representatives